The eastern margin of the Sea of Japan is a zone of concentrated geological strain which extends several hundred kilometers and north–south along the eastern margin of the Sea of Japan. The margin has undergone convergence tectonics since the end of the Pliocene. It is believed to be an incipient subduction zone which defines the tectonic boundary between the Amurian and Okhotsk plates. This geological zone is seismically active and has been the source of destructive tsunamis. The feature runs off the west coast of Honshu, passes west of the Shakotan Peninsula on Hokkaido and through the Strait of Tartary, between Sakhalin and mainland Russia.

Plate tectonics

The Sea of Japan represents a back-arc basin that formed via geological rifting of continental crust from the late Oligocene to middle Miocene (28–13 million years ago). The Sea of Japan can be divided into sub-basins; the Japan Basin, Yamato Basin and Tsushima Basin. Seafloor spreading in the Sea of Japan was restricted to the Japan Basin and ceased by the middle Miocene.

Following the end of seafloor spreading, its eastern margin experienced weak compression between 10 and 3.5 million years ago. Crustal shortening has been ongoing in the eastern margin and back-arc region of the Northeastern Japan Arc since 3.5 million years ago. This deformation is attributed to east–west compressive forces, forming fold and thrust belts along the eastern margin. The southern margin was subjected to north–south or northwest–southeast compression about 8–5 million years ago. Presently, the southern margin hosts mainly strike-slip faults.

The margin is located at the boundary marking the Amurian and Okhotsk plates. Oceanic lithosphere from the Sea of Japan located on the Amurian Plate converges with the Japanese archipelago on the Okhotsk Plate. A Wadati–Benioff zone which is evidence for subduction, is absent in the zone, hence subduction is doubtful. However, it may be an incipient eastward-dipping subduction zone. In 1983, it was proposed that subduction along the eastern margin commenced about 1–2 million years ago.

The basis for defining this tectonic boundary is the occurrence of large magnitude 7 or greater earthquakes along a linear zone from offshore Niigata Prefecture to off the west coast of Hokkaido. Following the 1983 Nihonkai-Chubu earthquake, 
the idea of a young plate boundary was proposed, but its mechanism is unknown—it has been proposed as a transform boundary or collision zone.

Location

The margin passes north–south through the Shakotan Peninsula, Oshima Peninsula, and Tōhoku region. It junctions with the Niigata–Kobe Tectonic Zone and Itoigawa-Shizuoka Tectonic Line between Sado Island and the Noto Peninsula. It strikes southwest in the western part of Fukushima Prefecture and extends to the border of Nagano and Toyama Prefecture. It exits north of Lake Biwa and continues to the eastern part of Shimane Prefecture. In the Sea of Japan, the cluster of extensional faults which were active during the formation of the sea remained. After the Pliocene, the stress field evolved from extensional to convergence. The compressive forces reactivated these faults and displayed thrust mechanisms.

Seismicity and tsunamis

The eastern margin of the Sea of Japan was the source of historically destructive earthquakes and tsunamis. These events were considered intraplate earthquakes until 1983 when the plate boundary theory was proposed. The associated geological faults related to the opening of the sea and compressive forces along the eastern margin influences seismic activity. Large earthquakes which occurred in 1833, 1940, 1964, 1983, and 1993 were the result of reverse faulting associated with the present deformation. The Sea of Japan is considered one of the world's most seismically active back-arc basins.

Offshore earthquakes

Large earthquakes with epicenters offshore and north of the Noto Peninsula are mostly accompanied by tsunamis. These events have recurrence intervals of 1,000 years. Due to their closer proximity to land, the accompanying tsunamis requires a shorter time arriving compared to earthquakes along Japan's Pacific coast. These earthquake tend to generate considerably large tsunamis.

Hazard
Off the coast of Akita Prefecture lies a -long seismic gap known as the Akita-Oki seismic gap. No large earthquakes have ruptured the plate boundary segment historically. The seismic gap lies between the rupture areas of the 1983 and 1833 earthquakes. The Akita-Oki seismic gap is capable of producing a magnitude 7.5 earthquake; expected to occur by the end of the 21st century.

See also
List of tectonic plates
List of tectonic plate interactions

References

Seismic faults of Japan
Geology of Japan
Sea of Japan
Subduction zones
Geology of Russia
Geology of the Pacific Ocean
Geography of East Asia
Geography of Hokkaido